In mathematics, particularly in the area of arithmetic, a modular multiplicative inverse of an integer  is an integer  such that the product  is congruent to 1 with respect to the modulus . In the standard notation of modular arithmetic this congruence is written as

which is the shorthand way of writing the statement that  divides (evenly) the quantity , or, put another way, the remainder after dividing  by the integer  is 1. If  does have an inverse modulo , then there are an infinite number of solutions of this congruence, which form a congruence class with respect to this modulus.
 
where the symbol  denotes the multiplication of equivalence classes modulo .
Written in this way, the analogy with the usual concept of a multiplicative inverse in the set of rational or real numbers is clearly represented, replacing the numbers by congruence classes and altering the binary operation appropriately.  

As with the analogous operation on the real numbers, a fundamental use of this operation is in solving, when possible, linear congruences of the form
 
Finding modular multiplicative inverses also has practical applications in the field of cryptography, i.e. public-key cryptography and the RSA algorithm. A benefit for the computer implementation of these applications is that there exists a very fast algorithm (the extended Euclidean algorithm) that can be used for the calculation of modular multiplicative inverses.

Modular arithmetic

This binary relation is denoted by, 

This is an equivalence relation on the set of integers, and the equivalence classes are called congruence classes modulo  or residue classes modulo . Let  denote the congruence class containing the integer , then

A linear congruence is a modular congruence of the form

Unlike linear equations over the reals, linear congruences may have zero, one or several solutions.

If  divides , then there are exactly  solutions.

A modular multiplicative inverse of an integer  with respect to the modulus  is a solution of the linear congruence

The previous result says that a solution exists if and only if , that is,  and  must be relatively prime (i.e. coprime).

therefore

If , then , and  won't even have a modular multiplicative inverse. Therefore, {{math|b ≡ b (mod m)}}.

When  has a solution it is often denoted in this way −

The notation would be proper if  is interpreted as a token standing for the congruence class , as the multiplicative inverse of a congruence class is a congruence class with the multiplication defined in the next section.

Integers modulo 
The congruence relation, modulo , partitions the set of integers into  congruence classes. Operations of addition and multiplication can be defined on these  objects in the following way: To either add or multiply two congruence classes, first pick a representative (in any way) from each class, then perform the usual operation for integers on the two representatives and finally take the congruence class that the result of the integer operation lies in as the result of the operation on the congruence classes.

and

These operations are well-defined, meaning that the end result does not depend on the choices of representatives that were made to obtain the result.

The  congruence classes with these two defined operations form a ring, called the ring of integers modulo .

Any set of  integers selected so that each comes from a different congruence class modulo m is called a complete system of residues modulo . The division algorithm shows that the set of integers,  form a complete system of residues modulo , known as the least residue system modulo . In working with arithmetic problems it is sometimes more convenient to work with a complete system of residues and use the language of congruences while at other times the point of view of the congruence classes of the ring  is more useful.

Multiplicative group of integers modulo 

Not every element of a complete residue system modulo  has a modular multiplicative inverse, for instance, zero never does.

In a general ring with unity not every element has a multiplicative inverse and those that do are called units. As the product of two units is a unit, the units of a ring form a group, the group of units of the ring and often denoted by  if  is the name of the ring. The group of units of the ring of integers modulo  is called the multiplicative group of integers modulo ''', and it is isomorphic to a reduced residue system. In particular, it has order (size), .

In the case that  is a prime, say , then  and all the non-zero elements of  have multiplicative inverses, thus  is a finite field. In this case, the multiplicative group of integers modulo  form a cyclic group of order .

Example

The following example uses the modulus 10: Two integers are congruent mod 10 if and only if their difference is divisible by 10, for instance
 since 10 divides 32 − 2 = 30, and
 since 10 divides 111 − 1 = 110.

Some of the ten congruence classes with respect to this modulus are:
 

 and

The linear congruence  has no solutions since the integers that are congruent to 5 (i.e., those in ) are all odd while  is always even. The  and 2 does not divide 5, but does divide 6.

Since , the linear congruence  will have solutions, that is, modular multiplicative inverses of 3 modulo 10 will exist. In fact, 7 satisfies this congruence (i.e., 21 − 1 = 20). However, other integers also satisfy the congruence, for instance 17 and −3 (i.e., 3(17) − 1 = 50 and 3(−3) − 1 = −10). In particular, every integer in  will satisfy the congruence since these integers have the form  for some integer  and 

is divisible by 10. This congruence has only this one congruence class of solutions. The solution in this case could have been obtained by checking all possible cases, but systematic algorithms would be needed for larger moduli and these will be given in the next section. 

Thus, . Addition is defined in a similar way. The ten congruence classes together with these operations of addition and multiplication of congruence classes form the ring of integers modulo 10, i.e., .

A complete residue system modulo 10 can be the set {10, −9, 2, 13, 24, −15, 26, 37, 8, 9} where each integer is in a different congruence class modulo 10. The unique least residue system modulo 10 is {0, 1, 2, ..., 9}. A reduced residue system modulo 10 could be {1, 3, 7, 9}. The product of any two congruence classes represented by these numbers is again one of these four congruence classes. This implies that these four congruence classes form a group, in this case the cyclic group of order four, having either 3 or 7 as a (multiplicative) generator. The represented congruence classes form the group of units of the ring . These congruence classes are precisely the ones which have modular multiplicative inverses.

Computation
Extended Euclidean algorithm

A modular multiplicative inverse of  modulo  can be found by using the extended Euclidean algorithm.

If  has a multiplicative inverse modulo , this gcd must be 1. The last of several equations produced by the algorithm may be solved for this gcd. Then, using a method called "back substitution", an expression connecting the original parameters and this gcd can be obtained. In other words, integers  and  can be found to satisfy Bézout's identity,

Rewritten, this is

that is,

so, a modular multiplicative inverse of  has been calculated. A more efficient version of the algorithm is the extended Euclidean algorithm, which, by using auxiliary equations, reduces two passes through the algorithm (back substitution can be thought of as passing through the algorithm in reverse) to just one.

In big O notation, this algorithm runs in time , assuming , and is considered to be very fast and generally more efficient than its alternative, exponentiation.

Using Euler's theorem
As an alternative to the extended Euclidean algorithm, Euler's theorem may be used to compute modular inverses.

where  is Euler's totient function. Therefore, a modular multiplicative inverse can be found directly:

In the special case where  is a prime,  and a modular inverse is given by 
 

This method is generally slower than the extended Euclidean algorithm, but is sometimes used when an implementation for modular exponentiation is already available. Some disadvantages of this method include:
The value  must be known and the most efficient known computation requires 's factorization. Factorization is widely believed to be a computationally hard problem.
The relative cost of exponentiation. This algorithm itself requires a modular inverse mod , which is what was to be calculated in the first place. Without the Montgomery method, the standard binary exponentiation, which requires division mod  at every step, is a slow operation when  is large.

For this reason, the standard implementation of Curve25519 uses this technique to compute an inverse.

Multiple inverses
It is possible to compute the inverse of multiple numbers , modulo a common , with a single invocation of the Euclidean algorithm and three multiplications per additional input.

More specifically, the algorithm is (all arithmetic performed modulo ):
 Compute the prefix products  for all .
 Compute  using any available algorithm.
 For  from  down to 2, compute
  and
 .
 Finally, .

It is possible to perform the multiplications in a tree structure rather than linearly to exploit parallel computing.

Applications

Finding a modular multiplicative inverse has many applications in algorithms that rely on the theory of modular arithmetic. For instance, in cryptography the use of modular arithmetic permits some operations to be carried out more quickly and with fewer storage requirements, while other operations become more difficult. Both of these features can be used to advantage. In particular, in the RSA algorithm, encrypting and decrypting a message is done using a pair of numbers that are multiplicative inverses with respect to a carefully selected modulus. One of these numbers is made public and can be used in a rapid encryption procedure, while the other, used in the decryption procedure, is kept hidden. Determining the hidden number from the public number is considered to be computationally infeasible and this is what makes the system work to ensure privacy.

One solution is as follows:
This inverse will exist since the numbers are odd and the modulus has no odd factors.

On many machines, particularly those without hardware support for division, division is a slower operation than multiplication, so this approach can yield a considerable speedup. The first step is relatively slow but only needs to be done once.

Modular multiplicative inverses are used to obtain a solution of a system of linear congruences that is guaranteed by the Chinese Remainder Theorem. 

For example, the system
 ≡ 4  (mod 5)
 ≡ 4  (mod 7)
 ≡ 6  (mod 11)
has common solutions since 5,7 and 11 are pairwise coprime. A solution is given by
  =  (7 × 11) × 4 +  (5 × 11) × 4 +  (5 × 7) × 6
where
 = 3 is the modular multiplicative inverse of 7 × 11 (mod 5), 
 = 6 is the modular multiplicative inverse of 5 × 11 (mod 7) and 
 = 6 is the modular multiplicative inverse of 5 × 7 (mod 11). 
Thus,
      = 3 × (7 × 11) × 4 + 6 × (5 × 11) × 4 + 6 × (5 × 7) × 6 = 3504
and in its unique reduced form
      ≡ 3504 ≡ 39 (mod 385)
since 385 is the LCM of 5,7 and 11.

Also, the modular multiplicative inverse figures prominently in the definition of the Kloosterman sum.

See also
 Inversive congruential generator – a pseudo-random number generator that uses modular multiplicative inverses
 Rational reconstruction (mathematics)

Notes

References

External links

 Guevara Vasquez, Fernando provides a solved example of solving the modulo multiplicative inverse using Euclid's Algorithm

Modular arithmetic
Binary operations